A by-election was held in the Legislative Assembly of Queensland seat of Kurwongbah on 24 May 1997. It was triggered by the resignation of sitting Labor member Margaret Woodgate. The by-election was won by Labor candidate Linda Lavarch.

Result

See also
List of Queensland state by-elections

References
Kurwongbah state by-election, 1997

1997 elections in Australia
Queensland state by-elections
1990s in Queensland
May 1997 events in Australia